The Women's Herald Sun Tour is an annual professional road bicycle racing event for women in Australia. It is held in conjunction with the Herald Sun Tour.

Winners

Classification leaders' jerseys

References

Cycle races in Australia
Recurring sporting events established in 2018
2018 establishments in Australia
Women's road bicycle races
Annual sporting events in Australia